Walter Baker Sports Centre is located in Barrhaven a suburb in Ottawa, Ontario, Canada in the former City of Nepean at 100 Malvern Drive. Walter Baker is attached to John McCrae Secondary School since the school was built in 1999. The center has 2 Ice Hockey rinks and maintains both rinks in the summer season. Housing the Ruth E. Dickinson branch of the Ottawa Public Library, the building also includes a pool area with 4 pools, a hot tub, a rock wall, an inflatable obstacle course (Wibit), and a steam room. The building also offers an upper gym with weights and cardio machines and a lower gym with free weights, as well as 4 squash courts. The centre is served by OC Transpo routes 170, 173 & 272.

History

Walter Baker was first known as South Nepean Centre. It was built for the former City of Nepean, Ontario in 1980 and was officially opened on October 4, 1980 by Ben Franklin, then the mayor. It wasn't until November 24, 1983 that the centre was named in memory of Walter Baker, the local Member of Parliament for Nepean-Carleton.

Facilities

Arena

Walter Baker has two ice rinks in the arena area. Both rinks are NHL size 200x85 feet. Both rinks are maintained throughout the winter and summer seasons. Nepean Minor Hockey Association is a hockey league that uses these arena's the most. There is also many other groups including Nepean Ringette, Many local Men's Leagues and Skating Clubs.

Pool
The Pool area has a 25-metre lap pool, dive tank, a training pool, a rock climbing wall in the dive tank, children's pool, inflatable obstacle course (Wibit), and a hot tub for swimming activities. There is also a steam room located beside the hot tub. The pool is used by many groups and the City of Ottawa offers many programs and lessons for all ages. The pool is also used by many swim and diving clubs. All pools are supervised by highly trained and skilled lifeguards.

References

External links
 Walter Baker Sports Centre

Indoor ice hockey venues in Canada
Soccer venues in Canada
Sports venues in Ottawa
Art museums and galleries in Ontario